The Battle of Atenquique took place on 2 July 1858, during the Reform War, in the vicinity of the canyon Atenquique near the Nevado de Colima in the state of Jalisco, Mexico. The conflict was between elements of the liberal army, under General Santos Degollado, and conservative troops, commanded by General Miguel Miramón. The battle caused heavy losses for both sides. Some consider the result undecided, although most historians qualify it as a win with a clear advantage for conservatives: Miramón's troops obtained control of the state of Jalisco. Additionally, Degollado became known as the Hero of the Defeats, for his troops' constant failures.

References

History of Jalisco
1858 in Mexico
Conflicts in 1858
July 1858 events
Reform War